Jonathan John (born 9 May 2001) is a Nigerian professional footballer who plays as a defender who plays for Gomel.

References

External links 
 
 

2001 births
Living people
Sportspeople from Kaduna
Nigerian footballers
Nigerian expatriate footballers
Expatriate footballers in Moldova
Nigerian expatriate sportspeople in Moldova
Expatriate footballers in Belarus
Nigerian expatriate sportspeople in Belarus
Association football defenders
FC Sucleia players
FC Slutsk players
FC Gomel players
Belarusian Premier League players